Holy Man is the 6th solo album of Joe Lynn Turner released in 2000. 'Freedoms Wings' was an outtake of Hurry Up and Wait and a reworked version was released on this album (the original version featured vocals of Doogie White)

Track listing
"No Salvation" (Kajiyama/Turner) - 4:40
"Holy Man" (Held/Kajiyama/Turner) - 4:38
"Anything" (Held/Kajiyama/Turner) - 4:57
"Honest Crime" (Bonamassa/Held/Turner) - 4:10
"Wolves at the Door" (Bonamassa/Held/Turner) - 3:38
"Angel" (Bonamassa/Held/Turner) - 4:27
"Something New" (Cochran/Turner) - 4:41
"Love is Blind" (Held/Teeley) - 3:40
"Breaking Away" (Cochran/Young) - 2:50
"Midnight in Tokyo" (Held/Kajiyama/Turner) - 5:05
"Babylon" (Kajiyama/Turner) - 3:44
"Closer" (Kajiyama/Turner) - 4:53
"Too Blue to Sing the Blues" (Kajiyama/Pitrelli/Held/Brown) - 4:31

Personnel

Joe Lynn Turner: Lead vocals, Backing vocals on 2,7,8,9,12
Akira Kajiyama: Guitar on 1,2,3,10,11,12,13
Eric Czar: Bass on 1,2,3,10,11,12,13
Greg Smith: Bass on 4,5,6,7,8,9
Kenny Kramme: Drums
Paul Morris: Keyboards

Guest Guitar

Joe Bonamassa: Guitar on 4,5,6
Karl Cochran: Guitar on 7,9
Al Pitrelli: Guitar final solo on 13, Additional guitars on 6
Andy Timmons: Guitar solo on 4,7
Alan Schwartz: Guitar final solo on 6,9
Tom Teeley: Guitar on 8, Backing vocals on 2,7,9

Backing Vocals

Nancy Bender: Backing vocals on 2,7,9,12
Tabitha Fair: Backing vocals on 2,7,9,12
Benny Harrison: Backing vocals on 8
Eric Miranda: Backing vocals on 8

References

2000 albums
Joe Lynn Turner albums